Cyclazocine is a mixed opioid agonist/antagonist related to dezocine, pentazocine and phenazocine. This family of opioid drugs is called the benzomorphans or benzazocines. It is a KOR agonist and MOR partial agonist, and also has high affinity for the DOR.

Use 
Research into the use of cyclazocine for the treatment of bipolar patients with depression was undertaken by Fink and colleagues (1970). It showed that 8 out of 10 patients experienced moderate improvement.

Research during the 1960s and 1970s into the possible use of cyclazocine for management of pain, and later for assisting treatment of narcotic addiction was severely hampered by the drug's psychotomimetic, dysphoric, and hallucinatory effects. The dysphoric/anxiety inducing effects of the drug correlate with increasing dosage and would likely reduce the risk of abuse in the same manner as other opioids which preferentially act on the KOR versus the DOR and MOR, although the side-effect threshold is often lower than the lowest effective dose.

See also 
 Benzomorphan

References 

Synthetic opioids
Phenols
Benzomorphans
Kappa-opioid receptor agonists